Jillian Murray is an American actress. She is known for her roles as Portlyn on Sonny with a Chance, Olivia on MTV's Awkward, Gwen Adams in American High School, Lex Mitchell in Forget Me Not, Brandi Cox in Wild Things: Foursome, and as the body model for Dr. Liara T'Soni for the Mass Effect video game series. She played Dr. Heather Pinkney in the first two seasons of the CBS medical drama Code Black.

Early life
Murray was born in Reading, Pennsylvania, and grew up in Wyomissing in Berks County, Pennsylvania. In 1998, she and her parents moved to Tucson, Arizona; Murray later relocated to Los Angeles to pursue a career in film.

Career
Murray made her film debut in the 2003 independent film Deep Toad as Natashia. She was later cast in Fifty Pills as Jayne, followed by Legacy, also known as Pretty Little Devils. Her first leading role was in The Fun Park, a 2007 indie horror flick, playing a mentally unstable girl.

In 2009, Murray portrayed Gwen Adams in the romantic comedy American High School. She later played Heather in the spoof comedy An American Carol, Abby Graves in the cult horror The Graves, and Lex Mitchell in Forget Me Not.

Murray starred in a recurring role on the Disney Channel original series Sonny with a Chance, playing Portlyn. She was offered a series regular role after the 4th episode but declined due to many film offers on the table. She landed the lead female role in the comedy Cougar Hunting playing Penelope (Lara Flynn Boyle's daughter), as well as the female lead in her first studio film in Wild Things: Foursome playing Brandi Cox. After wrapping that film in 2010 she was offered the lead female in her second studio film Never Back Down 2: The Beatdown playing Eve. This film is where she met her longtime boyfriend Dean Geyer.

Murray's face and body were used as the model for the character of Liara T'Soni in the Mass Effect franchise of video games. She recently appeared in the premiere episode of the 2011 revival of the reality series Fear Factor (where she came in second place and lost the first place title because her partner fell).

In 2012, Murray starred alongside Danny Trejo and Ron Perlman in the action film Bad Ass, and was cast in the horror film Cabin Fever: Patient Zero. She also produced her first film, Visible Scars, and starred in the film alongside Tom Sizemore. She landed a role on MTV's hit show Awkward playing Olivia. In 2013 she landed numerous indie flicks including Mantervention, Windsor Drive, and My Favorite Five. At the end of 2013, she played the female lead in a golf drama titled The Squeeze alongside Jeremy Sumpter, Christopher McDonald and Michael Nouri. In 2014 Murray was cast as Danni, one of the leads in the film Dark Ascension (originally titled Welcome to Purgatory).

In 2015, Murray was cast in the recurring role of Dr. Heather Pinkney on CBS's Code Black; in summer 2016 she was promoted to series regular for the show's second season.

Personal life
In 2010, Murray began dating Australian singer and actor Dean Geyer. The couple announced their engagement on December 18, 2016. They were married on September 14, 2017.

Filmography

Film

Television

Video games

References

External links

Jillian Murray on Myspace

Living people
21st-century American actresses
Actresses from Pennsylvania
American film actresses
American television actresses
Actors from Reading, Pennsylvania
Year of birth missing (living people)